Citrix Systems is an American computer software company that was founded in 1989 by Ed Iacobucci. Citrix creates and sells virtualization, cloud computing, networking and SaaS products that aim to provide remote connectivity to workers on a variety of devices.

The company's first acquisition was DataPac in 1997, which Citrix purchased in order to utilize DataPac's technology and its position in the Asia-Pacific region. Key acquisitions that contributed to the company's expansion include ExpertCity in 2004, NetScaler in 2005, XenSource in 2007 and ShareFile in 2011. As of 2015, Citrix had acquired nearly 50 companies.

Mergers and acquisitions

See also
Lists of corporate acquisitions and mergers

References

Citrix Systems
Citrix